HMS Northampton was a  armoured cruiser built for the Royal Navy in the 1870s. She was sold for scrap in 1905.

Design and description
The Nelson-class ships were designed as enlarged and improved versions of HMS Shannon to counter the threat of enemy armoured ships encountered abroad. Northampton displaced , about  more than Shannon. The steel-hulled ships were fitted with a ram and their crew numbered approximately 560 officers and other ranks.

The ship had two 3-cylinder, inverted compound steam engines, each driving a single propeller, using steam provided by 10 oval boilers. The cylinders of the Northamptons engines could be adjusted in volume to optimize steam production depending on the demand. They were troublesome throughout the ship's life and she was always about  slower than her sister despite repeated efforts to improve her speed. They were barque-rigged with three masts.

Construction and career

Northampton, named after the eponymous town, was laid down by Robert Napier and Sons at their shipyard in Govan, Scotland, launched on 18 December 1876, and completed on 7 December 1879.

Northampton was flagship of the North America and West Indies Station until she was placed in reserve in 1886. She was hulked as a boys' training ship in 1894 and used in home waters.

Captain Herbert Arthur Walton Onslow was in command from July 1897 to February 1902. After a refit in late 1899, she left in March 1900 for an extended recruiting cruise until August that year, visiting Portsmouth, Plymouth, Queenstown, Tarbert, Foynes, Lough Swilly, Campbeltown, Holyhead and Torbay. In November 1901 she put up at Chatham Dockyard for alterations and a refit, and was not finished until June the following year, when she was back as a training cruiser. Captain William G. White was in command in 1902, when she took part in the fleet review held at Spithead on 16 August 1902 for the coronation of King Edward VII. Captain Arthur John Horsley was appointed in command in October 1902. She was sold for breaking up in 1905 to Thos. W. Ward, of Morecambe.

Notes

References

External links 
 
 Shipping Times: Clydebuilt Database
 Pictures of HMS Northampton

 

Nelson-class cruisers
Victorian-era cruisers of the United Kingdom
Ships built on the River Clyde
Ships built in Govan
1876 ships